Aralia californica, known by the common name elk clover though not actually a clover, is a large herb in the family Araliaceae, the only member of the ginseng family native to California and southwestern Oregon. It is also called California aralia and California spikenard.

Description
It is a deciduous, herbaceous, perennial plant growing to a height of 2–3 m on stems which are thick but not woody. The stems bear large green pinnately compound or tri-pinnately compound leaves 1–2 m long and 1 m broad, the leaflets 15–30 cm long and 7–15 cm broad. The leaflets are arranged opposite with an odd terminal leaflet. The greenish white flowers are produced in large compound racemes of umbels 30–45 cm in diameter at the stem apex; each flower is 2–3 mm in diameter, and matures to small (3–5 mm) dark purple or black fruit, each berry containing 3–5 seeds.

It is distributed throughout western and central California and into Oregon. It is more common in cooler, moister areas in northern California, especially in the San Francisco Bay Area. Birds eat the plant's berries.

This plant is sometimes substituted for other species of its genus which are used as herbal remedies, such as American spikenard and Japanese spikenard. A preparation of the root has traditionally been used as an anti-inflammatory, a cough suppressant, and to treat arthritis.

The Concow tribe call the plant mâl-ē-mē' (Konkow language).

References

External links
Jepson Flora Project: Aralia californica
USDA Plants Profile
Photo gallery

californica
Flora of California
Flora of Oregon
Flora of the United States
Medicinal plants of North America
Flora without expected TNC conservation status